Ansorgia is a monotypic moth genus in the family Geometridae. Its only species, Ansorgia divergens, is found in Uganda. Both the genus and species were described by Warren in 1899.

References

Endemic fauna of Uganda
Larentiinae
Geometridae genera
Monotypic moth genera